The Tajikistan women's national basketball team is the women's basketball side that represents Tajikistan in international competitions.

The team usually plays friendly matches with teams of Iran and Afghanistan.

FIBA Asia Championship for Women record 
Yet to participate

Asian Games record 
Yet to participate

FIBA Asia Under-18 Championship for Women record 
Yet to participate

References

Women's national basketball teams
Basketball